NAD-dependent deacetylase sirtuin 7 is an enzyme that in humans is encoded by the SIRT7 gene. SIRT7 is member of the mammalian sirtuin family of proteins, which are homologs to the yeast Sir2 protein.

Function 
SIRT7 facilitates the transcription of DNA by DNA polymerase I, DNA polymerase II, and DNA polymerase III.

In humans cells, SIRT7 has only been shown to interact with two other molecules: RNA polymerase I (RNA Pol I) and upstream binding factor (UBF). SIRT7 is localized to the nucleolus and interacts with RNA Pol I. Chromatin immunoprecipitation studies demonstrate that SIRT7 localizes to rDNA, and coimmunoprecipitation shows that SIRT7 binds RNA Pol I. In addition SIRT7 interacts with UBF, a major component of the RNA Pol I initiation complex. It is not known whether or not SIRT7 is modifying RNA Pol I and/or UBF, and if so, what those modifications are.

SIRT7 is expressed more in metabolically active tissues, such as liver and spleen, and less in non-proliferating tissues, such as heart and brain. Furthermore, it has been shown that SIRT7 is necessary for rDNA transcription. Knock down of SIRT7 in HEK293 cells resulted in decreased rRNA levels. This same study found that this SIRT3 knockdown decreased the amount of RNA Pol I associated with rDNA, suggesting that SIRT7 may be required for rDNA transcription. Knock down SIRT7 led to reduced RNA Pol I levels, but RNA Pol I mRNA levels did not change. This suggests that SIRT7 plays a crucial role in connecting the function of chromatin remodeling complexes to RNA Pol I machinery during transcription.

SIRT7 may help attenuate DNA damage and thereby promoting cellular survival under conditions of genomic stress. Ribosomal DNA (rDNA) is more vulnerable to DNA damage than DNA elsewhere in the genome such than rDNA instability can lead to cellular senescence, and thus to senescence-associated secretory phenotype. SIRT7 localizes to rDNA thereby protecting against rDNA instability and cellular senescence.

DNA repair

Depletion of SIRT7 results in impaired repair of DNA double-strand breaks (DSBs) by the process of non-homologous end joining (NHEJ).  DSBs are one of the most significant types of DNA damage leading to genome instability.  SIRT7 is recruited to DSBs where it specifically deacylates histone H3 at lysine 18.  This affects the focal accumulation of the DNA damage response factor 53BP1, a protein that promotes NHEJ by protecting DNA from end resection.

SIRT7 overexpression has been shown to improve efficiency of NHEJ by 1.5-fold, and of homologous recombination by 2.8-fold.

Accelerated aging

Sirt7 mutant mice show phenotypic and molecular features of accelerated aging.  These features include premature curvature of the spine, reduced weight and fat content, compromised hematopoietic stem cell function and leukopenia, and multiple organ dysfunction.

Clinical relevance 

This gene has been found to be involved in maintenance of oncogenic transformation.

References

Further reading